Hexaphenylethane is a hypothetical organic compound consisting of an ethane core with six phenyl substituents.  All attempts at its synthesis have been unsuccessful.  The trityl free radical, Ph3C, was originally thought to dimerize to form hexaphenylethane.  However, an inspection of the NMR spectrum of this dimer reveals that it is in fact a non-symmetrical species, Gomberg's dimer instead.

A substituted derivative of hexaphenylethane, hexakis(3,5-di-t-butylphenyl)ethane, has however been prepared. It features a very long central C–C bond at 167 pm (compared to the typical bond length of 154 pm).  Attractive London dispersion forces between the t-butyl substituents are believed to be responsible for the stability of this very hindered molecule.

See also 
 Tetraphenylmethane

References

Literature 
 

Hypothetical chemical compounds
Aromatic hydrocarbons